The Bermuda Principles set out rules for the rapid and public release of DNA sequence data. The Human Genome Project, a multinational effort to sequence the human genome, generated vast quantities of data about the genetic make-up of humans and other organisms. But, in some respects, even more remarkable than the impressive quantity of data generated by the Human Genome Project is the speed at which that data has been released to the public. At a 1996 summit in Bermuda, leaders of the scientific community agreed on a groundbreaking set of principles requiring that all DNA sequence data be released in publicly accessible databases within twenty-four hours after generation. These "Bermuda Principles" (also known as the "Bermuda Accord") contravened the typical practice in the sciences of making experimental data available only after publication. These principles represent a significant achievement of private ordering in shaping the practices of an entire industry and have established rapid pre-publication data release as the norm in genomics and other fields.

The three principles retained originally were:
 Automatic release of sequence assemblies larger than 1 kb (preferably within 24 hours).
 Immediate publication of finished annotated sequences.
 Aim to make the entire sequence freely available in the public domain for both research and development in order to maximise benefits to society.

Sources 
 John E. Sulston: Heritage of Humanity, Le Monde diplomatique, Dec. 2002
 Policies on Release of Human Genomic Sequence Data 2003 
 Jorge L. Contreras, "Bermuda's Legacy: Policy, Patents and the Design of the Genome Commons", Minnesota Journal of Law, Science & Technology, Vol. 12, p. 61, 2011

See also 
 Fort Lauderdale Agreement
 Human Genome Project
 John E. Sulston
 Wellcome Trust
 Nagoya Protocol

Human genome projects
Principles
1996 in Bermuda